Anthony Louis Muto (June 21, 1934 – December 16, 2015) was an American fashion designer, who dressed three American First Ladies, Lady Bird Johnson, Rosalynn Carter and Barbara Bush.

Muto had his own labels, Marita by Anthony Muto and A.M./P.M., and designed for others including Joan Raines, Saz, and Jobère.

References

2015 deaths
American fashion designers
1934 births